Acrotomia is a genus of moths in the family Geometridae erected by Gottlieb August Wilhelm Herrich-Schäffer in 1855.

Species
Acrotomia muta Druce, 1892
Acrotomia trilva Schaus, 1901
Acrotomia viminaria Herrich-Schäffer, [1855]

References

Ennominae
Geometridae genera